A cricket team representing Antigua and Barbuda has been active since the late 1890s. The Antigua and Barbuda Cricket Association is a member of the Leeward Islands Cricket Association, which itself is a member association of the West Indies Cricket Board, and players from Antigua and Barbuda generally represent the Leeward Islands cricket team at domestic level and the West Indies at international level. The team made its List A debut at the 1998 Commonwealth Games, and its Twenty20 debut at the 2006 Stanford 20/20 tournament. As of 2015, the team has played 14 List A matches and four Twenty20 matches. The team captain is Sylvester Joseph, while Ridley Jacobs is the team coach.

History
In the mid-1890s, several touring English amateur sides played matches against Antiguan representative sides. R. S. Lucas' XI toured in 1895, winning by an innings and 69 runs, and A. A. Priestley's and Lord Hawke's XIs both toured in early 1897, winning by an innings and 96 runs and 259 runs, respectively. Part of the colony of the British Leeward Islands until 1958, and a member of the West Indies Federation between 1958 and 1962, Antigua played almost exclusively in the Leewards Islands Tournament, with occasional matches against touring teams, which included a "New Zealand Ambassadors" team in 1970, Kent in 1973 and 1979, and Canada in 1976. At West Indian domestic level, Antiguan and Barbudan cricketers represented the Leeward Islands cricket team, which debuted in the Shell Shield, the domestic first-class competition, in 1958. The Leeward Islands and the Windward Islands participated together as the Combined Islands cricket team from 1965 to 1981, when they separated again. Antigua and Barbuda gained independence in 1981, and from then on participated as "Antigua and Barbuda". The team toured Bermuda in September 1984, drawing a three-day match with the Bermuda national team.

At the 1998 Commonwealth Games held in Kuala Lumpur, Malaysia, Antigua and Barbuda fielded a separate team at the cricket tournament, as did Jamaica and Barbados. Matches at the tournament had List A status. Antigua and Barbuda were drawn in Group B, along with Australia, Canada, and India.  The team's first match, against India at the Tenaga National Sports Complex, finished in a no-result due to rain. The team was captained by Dave Joseph, and included seven West Indies international players: Curtly Ambrose, Eldine Baptiste, Kenny Benjamin, Winston Benjamin, Ridley Jacobs, Sylvester Joseph, and Richie Richardson. After losing to Australia and defeating Canada, Antigua and Barbuda finished second in Group B over India due to a higher net run rate, but did not qualify for the semi-finals. The team's leading run-scorer at the games was Ridley Jacobs, who scored 74 runs, and the leading wicket-taker was Anthony Lake.

As part of a reorganisation of the structure of cricket in the West Indies, Antigua and Barbuda, along with the other Leeward and Windward Islands constituent members, fielded teams at the Red Stripe Bowl, the domestic one-day tournament, in the 2001–02, 2002–03, and 2003–04 seasons. The team was largely unsuccessful, and did not progress beyond the group stage. Antigua and Barbuda also participated in the Stanford 20/20 tournament in 2006 and 2008, being knocked out in the quarter-finals in both instances. The team played a number of matches against touring sides in the mid-2000s, including against England, Pakistan, Zimbabwe, and India cricket team.

Grounds

The traditional home ground of Antigua and Barbuda is the Antigua Recreation Ground (pictured), the national stadium of the country, which has hosted a number of Test and One-Day International matches. Two further grounds, the Stanford Cricket Ground and Sir Vivian Richards Stadium, were constructed in 2004 and 2006 for use in the Stanford 20/20 and 2007 World Cup respectively, and have both been used in inter-island matches featuring Antigua and Barbuda.

Players

International Players

A number of Antigua players have represented the West Indies internationally.

 Apps denotes the number of appearances the player has made.
 Runs denotes the number of runs scored by the player.
 Wkts denotes the number of wickets taken by the player.

List A Players: 1998 - 2003

Stanford Twenty20 Players: 2006 & 2008

source: 
Stanford 20/20 Squad 2006
Stanford 20/20 Squad 2008

See also
 Antigua Hawksbills, a Twenty20 franchise
 List of Leeward Islands first-class cricketers

References

Cricket teams in the West Indies
National cricket teams
National sports teams of Antigua and Barbuda